Veerendra Raj Mehta is an Indian social worker, a former Joint Secretary to the Government of India, a trustee of Sir Dorabji Tata Trust and a former Senior Specialist of the Asian Development Bank in Manila, Philippines and a Consultant at the World Bank and the African Development Bank. He is the elder brother of Devendra Raj Mehta, a 2008 winner of Padma Bhushan and the founder of Bhagwan Mahaveer Viklang Sahayata Samiti (BMVSS), Jaipur, the makers of renowned Jaipur foot, where Veerendra Raj Mehta is also an honorary executive President.

Mehta is credited with taking Jaipur Foot beyond the Indian boundaries, founded the Mahaveer Philippines Foundation Inc. (MPFI) and has established three centres of the prosthetic makers in Philippines. He has been honoured by the Philippines House of Representatives in 2010 and has been presented with the key to the city of Manila in 1993. He was honoured by the Government of India in 2015 with Padma Shri, the fourth highest Indian civilian award.––He has co-authored a book titled "Mother Teresa - Inspiring Incidents" with his wife Vimla Mehta, based on their close association of 15 years with Mother Teresa and her work in Manila, Philippines.

See also

 Jaipur foot
 Sir Dorabji Tata Trust
 Asian Development Bank
 Devendra Raj Mehta

References

External links
 

Recipients of the Padma Shri in social work
Living people
Social workers
Social workers from Delhi
Indian Administrative Service officers
Year of birth missing (living people)